On Such a Night is a 1955 British short semi-documentary film directed by Anthony Asquith which offers a snap-shot of the Glyndebourne opera house in the 1950s, including extracts from Le nozze di Figaro, and a fictional first visit to the opera house by an American. The film was "very discreetly aimed at potential American audiences fascinated by British eccentricities".

Background
It was filmed at Pinewood Studios and Lewes railway station on 28 May to 12 June 1955, with the operatic excerpts on 6 June 1955. After a private viewing on 25 October that year, the first public showing was on 24 November 1955 at the Gaumont Haymarket cinema, London, on a bill with Simon and Laura.

Synopsis
An American tourist (David Knight) has been persuaded by to visit Alfriston but is bemused by what he witnesses at Victoria Station when people in evening dress join his train. After a confusing journey in a compartment with two men talking about a new countess, he alights at Lewes and is more baffled still when the formally dressed people get on a Southdown bus waiting there. He gets in a taxi and asks the driver to follow the bus. Arriving at the entrance of Glyndebourne, he explains to an upper-class lady (Marie Lohr) he had noticed at Victoria Station who is with her niece (Josephine Griffin) that he does not have a ticket, at which they ask John Christie who sees that he gets one.

During the performance he watches Sesto Bruscantini sing "Non più andrai" and Sena Jurinac (the "new Countess") sing "Porgi, amor". The end of the second-act finale is shown, with Franco Calabrese, Monica Sinclair, Hugues Cuénod and Ian Wallace, and the very end of the opera. There is also a scene of Carl Ebert rehearsing Jurinac and Rizzieri and of the conductor Vittorio Gui and the administrator Moran Caplat, and the orchestra playing croquet. The film ends with the lady giving the American her ticket for Don Giovanni the following week so that he can come with her niece.

Cast
 David Knight as David Cornell
 Marie Lohr as Lady Falconbridge
 Josephine Griffin as Virginia Ridley
 Allan Cuthbertson as 1st gentleman
 Peter Jones as 2nd gentleman

In the opera extracts:
 Sesto Bruscantini as Figaro
  as Susanna
 Ian Wallace as Dr Bartolo
 Monica Sinclair as Marcellina
 Frances Bible as Cherubino
 Franco Calabrese as Count Almaviva
 Hugues Cuénod as Don Basilio
 Sena Jurinac as Countess Almaviva
 Gwyn Griffiths as Antonio
 Jeannette Sinclair as Barbarina
 Daniel McCoshan as Don Curzio

The Royal Philharmonic Orchestra is conducted by Vittorio Gui, and the film was issued on DVD in 2010, using a print from the BFI National Archive.

References

External links

1955 films
British short films
Films directed by Anthony Asquith
Films with screenplays by Paul Dehn
Films about opera
Films shot in East Sussex